Yora may refer to:
 Yora people, or Amahuaca, an ethnic group of the Amazon
 Yora language, a language of the Amazon
 Yora languages, an Australian language group

See also 
 Eora, an Australian ethnic group
 Iora
 Jora (disambiguation)
 Yura (disambiguation)

Language and nationality disambiguation pages